The 1999 ADAC Deutsche Super Touren Wagen-Meisterschaft was the sixth and final edition of the Super Tourenwagen Cup (STW).

Season summary

BMW, Nissan and Peugeot dropped their factory support for the last season of the STW. It saw a season-long battle between works Opel driver Uwe Alzen and semi-independent Audi driver Christian Abt. After winning the first four races of the season Abt took the championship lead which he would keep for the whole season, while Alzen battled to close the points gap. After his initial four-race streak Abt would only win one additional race while Alzen claimed six, and at the final race the gap was only a few points. Abt looked to have secured the title running in a strong position in the last race, but on the last lap he was taken out by Opel driver Roland Asch, who had already been black flagged for a previous incident. This allowed Alzen to claim the championship in a highly controversial fashion. The title would however be handed to Abt some months later by a DMSB court of appeal.

Teams and drivers

Race calendar and winners

Championship results

 '''Race 20 Nürburgring: Final standing based on lap 32 after Deutschen Motorsport-Bundes (DMSB) decision

Drivers Championship

External links 

Super Tourenwagen Cup
Super Tourenwagen Cup Season
Auto racing controversies